"Stratus" is a song by American alternative rock / post-hardcore band Moments in Grace, released on June 15, 2004. It was produced by Brian McTernan and distributed in the United States by Atlantic Records and Salad Days Records. The song was the first and only single from the band's debut full-length album, Moonlight Survived. On June 21, 2004, the song reached No. 2 on CMJ New Music Report's Loud College Rock, No. 3 on Loud Rock Crucial Spins, and No. 14 on CMJ Top 200. The single helped Moonlight Survived peak to No. 13 on CMJ's Top 200 chart on August 30, 2004, and the album spent six weeks on CMJ's Radio 200 chart, peaking to No. 109 on October 11, 2004.

On July 17, 2004, Moments in Grace filmed a music video for the song with director Laurent Briet in Los Angeles, California. The video premiered on August 12, 2004, five days before Moonlight Survived was released, and later aired on MTV and Fuse. Two days after the video's filming, on July 19, 2004, Moments in Grace was invited to MTV's Paramount Plaza studio for a photo shoot and video interview promoting the single. The track was regularly performed on the band's 2003–2005 promotional tour.

Track listing

Personnel 
Credits are adapted from the single's liner notes.

 Moments in Grace

 Jeremy Griffith – vocals, guitar, keyboards, organ, piano
 Justin Etheridge – guitar
 Jake Brown – bass guitar
 Timothy Kirkpatrick – drums

 Guest musicians

 Teri Lazar – violin
 Kim Miller – violin
 Osman Kivrak – viola
 Lisa Ferebee – cello
 Greg Watkins – double bass

 Production

 Brian McTernan – recording engineer, mixing engineer and producer at Salad Days
 Pedro Aida – assistant recording engineer at Salad Days
 Matt Squire – Pro Tools engineer at Salad Days
 Michael Barbiero – mixing engineer at Soundtracks
 George Marino – mastering engineer at Sterling Sound
 Charlie Barnett – string arranger
 Shelby Cinca – artwork and art direction at Passkontrol
 Gabriel Baldessin – artwork and art direction at Passkontrol

Charts

References 

2004 singles
2004 songs
Moments in Grace songs
Song recordings produced by Brian McTernan
Atlantic Records singles